L. Michael Henry (born June 1935), C.D., M.P, is the Member of Parliament for Central Clarendon and is the longest serving Jamaican Parliamentarian with more than 30 unbroken years in the Jamaican Parliament.

Education
 Ealing Technical College, United Kingdom- Bachelor of Arts- Marketing
 Beckford and Smith High School (St. Jago High), Jamaica

Awards
 2002	Order of Distinction- Commander Rank: 20 years of service to Parliament	
 1998	Silver Musgrave Award, Literature

Political background

Served as deputy leader of the Jamaica Labour Party (10) years; Member of Parliament (MP) Central Clarendon since 1980; one of the longest serving MPs in the Jamaican House of Parliament with function and responsibilities as follows:

 1973 		Joined the JLP
 1975 – 76	Sought to represent a St. Catherine constituency. Chosen by Party to move to Central Clarendon.
 1976 	        Unsuccessful campaign for Member of Parliament for Central Clarendon – shot while campaigning in York Town
 1980		Elected Member of Parliament, Central Clarendon for over 30 years.
 1981–82	State Minister for Youth and Local Government
 1982–83	State Minister for Information in the Ministry of  Tourism
 1984–89 	State Minister in the Office of the Prime Minister, with responsibility for Culture
 1989–92	Minister of State for Youth and Sports
 1982-91	Deputy Leader, Jamaica Labour Party (last nationally elected Deputy Leader at a JLP conference)
 1980		Member, Public Accounts Committee of Parliament
 2002–07 	Chairman, Public Accounts Committee of Parliament
 2007–11	Minister of Transport and Works
 2010–12	Chairman, Jamaica Labour Party
 2016–18	Minister of Transport and Mining
 2018–	        Minister without Portfolio in the Office of the Prime Minister.

Professional summary
 An entrepreneur, compiler, author and publisher:
 Chairman - LMH Publishing Limited, Jamaica
 Chairman - LMH Retail Limited; LMH Retail (Montego Bay) Limited, Jamaica
 Chief Executive Officer- Kingston Publisher Limited, Jamaica
 Managing Director- Far Eastern Publishers Ltd, Jurong, Singapore
 Far East & Central Asia Rep- McGraw Hill Far East Ltd, Singapore
 Central America & Caribbean Rep- Williams Collins Publisher, United Kingdom
 Managing Director- Collins Sangster Publishers, United Kingdom
 Midlands Zone Manager- S & H Stamps, United Kingdom
 Sales and Marketing Manager - Knitting Machine Co., United Kingdom
 Accounts Manager- Grove Shopfitters, Cheswick, London
 Tire Builder - Firestone, United Kingdom

Publications

 Editor- Every Student’s Handbook & Jamaican Cocktails and Mixed Drinks 
 Author- Rosehall’s White Witch: The Legend of Annie Palmer
 Co-author- LMH Dictionary Series, Marley and Me, Beautiful Jamaica-
 Jamaica in Pictures, Reggae Road to Soccer Glory
 Compiler - Bustamante: Portrait of a Hero
 Contributor - Insight Guide Jamaica
 Author - Many Rivers to Cross: A Political Journey of Audacious Hope

References

1935 births
Living people
Jamaica Labour Party politicians
Commanders of the Order of Distinction
20th-century Jamaican politicians
21st-century Jamaican politicians
Members of the House of Representatives of Jamaica
Members of the 14th Parliament of Jamaica